These are the results of the women's uneven bars competition, one of six events for female competitors in artistic gymnastics at the 1996 Summer Olympics in Atlanta. The qualification and final rounds took place on July 21, 23 and 28th at the Georgia Dome.

Results

Qualification

Eighty-nine gymnasts competed in the uneven bars event during the compulsory and optional rounds on July 21 and 23.  The eight highest scoring gymnasts advanced to the final on July 28.  Each country was limited to two competitors in the final.

Final
The 1996 Summer Olympics in Atlanta was also the last games to allow awarding of joint medals for identical scores in artistic gymnastics as there were no tie-breaking rules established yet at the time to separate gymnasts who tied with the same scores.

References
Official Olympic Report
www.gymnasticsresults.com

Women's Uneven Bars
1996 in women's gymnastics
Women's events at the 1996 Summer Olympics